The Magical Duvet is a 2011 Czech musical film directed by F. A. Brabec. It is the first Czech non-animated 3D feature film.

Cast
 Eliška Balzerová as Babička
 Karel Bělohradský as Velký chlap / Holubář
 Lucie Bílá as Maminka
 Nina Divíšková as Hilda
 Arnošt Goldflam as Policista
 Jana Krausová as Paní na hlídání
 Kryštof Michal as Metař
 Alena Mihulová as Pekařka
 Nikol Moravcová as Dívka Sen
 Jiří Mádl as Pan Karel
 Amelie Pokorná as Vendulka
 Bolek Polívka as Dědeček
 Matej Převrátil as Matěj
 Tomáš Racek as Řezník
 Karel Roden as Tatínek

References

External links
 

2011 films
2011 3D films
2010s musical films
2010s Czech-language films
Czech musical films